Everybody Loves Ice Prince (abbreviated as E.L.I) is the debut studio album by Nigerian rapper Ice Prince. It was released by Chocolate City on October 9, 2011. The album's production was primarily handled by Jesse Jagz, along with additional production from M.I Abaga, Wizboyy, E Kelly, Samklef and Chopstix. It features collaborations with Brymo, Wizkid, 2 Face Idibia, Jesse Jagz, M.I, Yung L, J-Milla, Samklef, Wizboyy, Morell and Sean Tero. The album was supported by the singles "Oleku", "Superstar" and "Juju". E.L.I is a mixture of hip hop, R&B, dancehall, raga, Afrobeats, reggae, highlife and soul.

Background and launch concert
Ice Prince signed a record deal with Chocolate City in 2009. He spent the next year featuring on the tracks of other artists, including Naeto C and Banky W. Moreover, he started  working on the album with label mates Brymo, M.I and Jesse Jagz. In writing the album, Ice Prince wanted to create a work that would not let his fans down after all they had done for him. Days before its release, the album was known simply as E.L.I., with the full title being kept under wraps. Prior to Chocolate City disclosing that E.L.I is an acronym for Everybody Loves Ice Prince, there were numerous speculations about its meaning. While speaking to the Nigerian Tribune about the album, Ice Prince said, "At first, I wanted to name the album after the street I used to live in Jos but when I lost my mother, the mad love I got from everybody around the world made me change it to Everybody Loves Ice Prince".

E.L.I is predominantly hip hop, but incorporates elements of R&B, dancehall, raga, Afrobeats, reggae, highlife and soul. Ice Prince deliberately explores these genres to avoid being seen as "just another rapper". In an interview with Naija Entertainment, he described the album as a "fusion of many genres". According to Chocolate City, E.L.I is an album centered around and influenced by love and music. Ice Prince said the album draws a lot of influence and motivation from his mother’s death, as well as from the outpouring of love and encouragement he received as consolation from his fans. All songs on the album were written by Panshak Zamani, except where the track features another artist.

E.L.I was launched in Lagos on 9 October 2011, at the Expo Hall of the Eko Hotels and Suites. The launch concert featured performances from Ice Prince Jesse Jagz, M.I, DJ Caise,  2face Idibia, D'banj, Wizkid, Naeto C, D'Prince, Tiwa Savage, Samklef, Brymo, Hip Hop Pantsula and Sarkodie. It was hosted by radio personality Ikponmwosa Osakioduwa and actress Funke Akindele.

Singles
The album's lead single "Oleku" was released on June 8, 2011. It was well-received and created anticipation behind the album. The song is one of the most remixed Nigerian songs of 2010. The album's second single "Superstar" was released on April 22, 2011. It received radio airplay, but was not as successful as "Oleku". "Juju" was released as the album's third single. The accompanying music video for "Juju" was directed by Godfather Productions; it leaked on February 18, 2012.

Critical reception
Everybody Loves Ice Prince received mixed reviews from music critics. It was generally a good album, but did not live up to the hype surrounding it. Some critics found that in an attempt to appeal to a majority of the public by mixing in a lot of genres, Ice Prince lost the direction and unifying sound of a pure hip hop record. Others have commended Ice Prince on adding other genres because they feel that it creates a new sound and adds variety to the listening experience. The variety of styles reflects on the full scope of the music Ice Prince writes, rather than just one section of it.

Another criticism of the album was that it varies greatly in the quality of the music. Some critics found that the album was made up of several excellent songs, strung together by a fleet of bad ones. A common complaint was that the lyrics were full of cheesy lines, which do not help his (Ice Prince’s) credibility. The album was commended on its catchy singable tunes and public appeal. 
Generally, Everybody Loves Ice Prince was praised for being a great shot at a debut album, if not slightly over hyped.

Accolades
E.L.I won Best Rap Album and was nominated for Album of the Year at The Headies 2012.

Track listing

Personnel
The following people contributed to Everybody Loves Ice Prince:

Panshak Zamani – primary artist, writer
Audu Maikori – executive producer
Paul Okeugo – executive producer
Yahaya Maikori – executive producer
Jesse Abaga – co-executive producer, featured artist, production 
Jude Abaga – co-executive producer, featured artist, mixing, mastering, production 
Abuchi "Don Boos Boos" Ugwu – mixing and mastering 
Wizboyy – featured artist, production 
E Kelly – production 
Samklef – featured artist, production 
Chopstix –  production 
Yung L – featured artist
J-Milla – featured artist
Ayodeji Balogun – featured artist
Innocent Ujah Idibia – featured artist
Olawale Ashimi – featured artist
Sean Tero – featured artist
Morell – featured artist
Ogbonnaya “Big Meech” Chukwudi – art direction and cover design
Augustine Victor Udoh – photography
Bishmang Nanle – A&R/management
Doosuur Tilley Gyado – A&R/management
Terver "Trump" Malu – team member 
Amaka Okwuonu – team member  
Kunle Peter Thomas – team member  
Mavrik Films – team member
Sola Oladebo – team member
Ibiyemi Bello – team member
Bukola Izeogu – team member
Seyi Sanusi – team member
Sam Lolo – team member
Ebere Thomas – team member
Oyiboka George – team member
Katung Aduwak – team member

References

2011 albums
Ice Prince albums
Albums produced by Jesse Jagz
Albums produced by Chopstix
Albums produced by Samklef
Chocolate City (music label) albums